Northfield Park Arboretum is a public park and arboretum located in Gering, Nebraska.

History
The Northfield Park Arboretum was once a long and narrow canyon, and now is considered a "living exhibition" of trees, shrubs, and other botanical life that grows in the Gering region. It has the traditional arboretum "park" setting, with plants that need additional care to thrive in the area, as well as a "natural" area that displays native plants adapted to the park's conditions.

Staff
Curator of Northfield Park Arboretum is Ron Ernst.

See also
 List of botanical gardens in the United States

External links
Photos from Gering Parks & Rec

References

Arboreta in Nebraska
Botanical gardens in Nebraska
Protected areas of Scotts Bluff County, Nebraska